Edward Bennett (born 1950, Cambridge, Cambridgeshire) is a British film and TV director. He was educated at Eton College. His most notable film is Ascendancy (1982), for which he won the Golden Bear at the 33rd Berlin International Film Festival. The following year he was a member of the jury at the 34th Berlin International Film Festival.

He has also directed episodes of Bergerac, C.A.T.S. Eyes and Inspector Morse.

References

External links

1950 births
People educated at Eton College
Living people
People from Cambridge
English film directors
English television directors
Directors of Golden Bear winners